Robert John Audley was a British psychologist whose research was concerned with choice and decision-making.

Career
Robert (Bob) Audley was born in London in 1925. Following national service, he obtained his BSc from University College London in 1949.  Among his lecturers was E.S. Pearson. He then obtained a Fulbright scholarship which took him to Washington State University. On his return he completed a PhD supervised by A.R. Jonckheere at UCL. He was appointed to the faculty and remained there for the whole of his academic career.  He served as head of department.

He was active in the British Psychological Society of which he became president in 1981. His Presidential address was on the subject of choice. He was Editor of the British Journal of Mathematical and Statistical Psychology from 1963 to 1969. He was also President of the Experimental Psychology Society about which he was interviewed.

Research
There were three strands to his research. The first strand, as a mathematical psychologist, he developed a Theory of Choice to explain the process of decision-making (Audley, 1960; Audley & Pike, 1965). His second strand was on reaction time (Audley, Caudrey, Howell and Powell, 1975) and the third was on medical accidents (Audley, Vincents & Ennis, 1993).

Publications
 Audley, R.J. (1960). A stochastic model for individual choice behaviour.
 Audley, R.J., & Pike, A.R. (1965). Some alternative models of choice.
 Audley, R.J. (1970). Choosing.
 Audley RJ; Caudrey DJ; Howell P; Powell DJ (1975) Reaction Time Exchange Functions in Choice Tasks. In Attention and Performance V, (pp. 281–295). 
 Audley, R.J., Vincent, C., & Ennis, M. (Eds)(1993) Medical Accidents. OUP.

Positions
 1969: President, British Psychological Society
 1975: President, Experimental Psychology Society

References

1928 births
2020 deaths
British psychologists
Presidents of the British Psychological Society
20th-century British psychologists
Mathematical psychologists
Cognitive psychologists
Academics of University College London